Éloi Léon Eugène Joseph Auguste "Édouard" Mézan de Malartic (7 August 1870 – 16 November 1936) was a French sailor who represented his country at the 1900 Summer Olympics in Meulan, France. As helmsman on the boat Jeannette, de Malartic did not start the first race of the 0.5 to 1 ton and did not finish in the second race.

Further reading

References

External links

French male sailors (sport)
Sailors at the 1900 Summer Olympics – .5 to 1 ton
Olympic sailors of France
1870 births
1936 deaths
Sailors at the 1900 Summer Olympics – Open class
People from Saint-Gaudens, Haute-Garonne
Sportspeople from Haute-Garonne